Oystermouth railway station served the village of Oystermouth, in the historical county of Glamorgan, Wales, from 1807 to 1960 on the Swansea and Mumbles Railway.

History
The station was opened on 25 March 1807 by the Oystermouth Railway. The first services were horse drawn. Due to an increase in road traffic competition, the fares were reduced in 1826. The station closed in 1827 after the horse drawn services ended. It reopened on 11 November 1860 as Mumbles. It was resited 50 yards to the south on 6 May 1893 but the old station continued to be used. The old site was known as Elms. This site closed after December 1895. The station's name was changed to Oystermouth on 2 November 1895. It closed along with the line on 6 January 1960. The ticket office is still in use as a café.

References

Disused railway stations in Swansea
Railway stations in Great Britain opened in 1860
Railway stations in Great Britain closed in 1960
1960 disestablishments in Wales